David Richmond-Peck (born April 5, 1974) is a Canadian actor who has appeared in over 70 film and television roles in Canada and the United States since 2000.

Career
Richmond-Peck won two Leo Awards: in 2006 for Behind the Camera: The Unauthorized Story of Mork and Mindy and in 2010 for his acting in the short film Instant.

Personal life
Richmond-Peck was born in Oakville, Ontario. He graduated from Appleby College in 1992, later attending the University of Western Ontario where he was a member of Beta Theta Pi. He studied acting at Studio 58 in Vancouver.

Richmond-Peck is married to Canadian actress Alisen Down. They have a son named Lucas Gregory Blair Richmond-Peck.

Filmography

References

External links

 

1974 births
Living people
Canadian male film actors
Canadian male television actors
People from Oakville, Ontario
Male actors from Ontario
21st-century Canadian male actors
University of Western Ontario alumni
Studio 58 people